The 2006 Mount Union Purple Raiders football team was an American football team that represented the University of Mount Union in the Ohio Athletic Conference (OAC) during the 2006 NCAA Division III football season. In their 21st year under head coach Larry Kehres, the Purple Raiders compiled a perfect 15–0 record, won the OAC championship, advanced to the NCAA Division III playoffs, and defeated , 35–16, in the national championship game.

Sophomore tailback Nate Kmic led the team  with 2,365 rushing yards and 26 rushing touchdowns. By the conclusion of his senior season, Kmic became the all-time leading rusher in college football history.

The team played its home games at Mount Union Stadium in Alliance, Ohio.

Schedule

References

Mount Union
Mount Union Purple Raiders football seasons
NCAA Division III Football Champions
College football undefeated seasons
Mount Union Purple Raiders football